The 1970 Green Bay Packers season was their 52nd season overall and their 50th season in the National Football League. The team finished with a 6–8 record earning them a third consecutive third-place finish in the four-team NFC Central division. It was the third and final season for Phil Bengtson as head coach; he resigned shortly after the season ended.

Offseason 
The Packers' 1970 season began in a state of mourning. After a summer in and out of Georgetown Hospital, Vince Lombardi succumbed to cancer on September 3, at the age of 57. Over 3,500 people attended Lombardi's funeral in New York City, including pallbearers Bart Starr, Paul Hornung, and Willie Davis. Three days after his funeral, NFL commissioner Pete Rozelle announced that the Super Bowl trophy would be renamed in Lombardi's honor.

NFL draft 
In the 1970 NFL draft, the Packers used their two picks in the first-round to choose Mike McCoy and Rich McGeorge. The first pick was obtained from the Chicago Bears in a January trade that sent Lee Roy Caffey and Elijah Pitts to Chicago. In total, the Packers selected 20 players in the draft, nine of those being in the first seven rounds.

Incomplete list

Roster

Regular season

Schedule
The Packers finished 6–8 in the regular season, failing to reach the playoffs for the third consecutive season. The schedule had the Packers play their final five games on the road and they lost four of them. For the first time, the Packers lost to the Dallas Cowboys; this year's game was on Thanksgiving on the artificial turf of the Cotton Bowl. Green Bay had won the first six meetings, four in the regular season (1960, 1964, 1965, 1968) and two in NFL championship games (1966, 1967). The Packers won the next meeting in Green Bay in 1972.

Monday (October 12, November 9), Thursday (November 26)
Note: Intra-division opponents are in bold text.

Standings

Postseason
After a turbulent season filled with labor disputes, blowout losses, and the final merger of the AFL and NFL, the Packers had only their second losing season (1968) since 1958. Thoroughly frustrated, third-year head coach Phil Bengtson resigned two days after being shut out in the season finale against the Detroit Lions.  His overall record was 20–21–1 during three seasons as Lombardi's handpicked successor. Obviously the organization and the community craved the high standards of winning established a decade earlier; Lombardi's did not have a losing season but Bengston had two in three years and finished in third place in the four-team division each season.

The 1970 season was also the final season of Forrest Gregg as a Packer, a year later the Hall of Fame right tackle returned home to Texas to play for the Dallas Cowboys, where he joined his former teammates Herb Adderley and Lee Roy Caffey. The former Packer trio helped the Cowboys to win their 1st Super Bowl victory in franchise history.

Statistical leaders
The following players led the Packers in the following statistical categories in 1970.

References

External links
Packers.com
Sports_Encyclopedia.com
Database_Football.com

Green Bay Packers seasons
Green Bay Packers
Green